The Great Wall of China hoax was a faked newspaper story concocted on June 25, 1899 by four reporters in Denver, Colorado about bids by American businesses on a contract to demolish the Great Wall of China and construct a road in its place. The story was reprinted by a number of newspapers.

In 1939, an urban legend began when Denver songwriter Harry Lee Wilber claimed in a magazine article that the 1899 hoax had ignited the Boxer Rebellion of 1900. The radio commentators Paul Harvey and Dwight Sands perpetuated the legend. Variations have been incorporated into sermons about "the power of the tongue," a morality tale used by preachers to highlight the consequences of lying.

In fact, however, there was never any such connection, and Boxer activity intensified in response to the German invasion in Shandong during March 1899—before the hoax was invented. No Chinese history reference relates the hoax to the Boxer Rebellion.

The cultural historian Carlos Rojas comments that the original hoax being perpetuated by a second hoax, a "metahoax," illustrates the ability of the Great Wall to "mean radically different things in different contexts."

Background
The hoax was created at the height of imperialism during late 19th Century. In 1898, Britain obtained a 99-year lease for the New Territories, extending the Hong Kong colony that had been ceded in 1841. Britain also sent a fleet into the Bohai Sea and forced the Chinese to lease Weihaiwei.  Germany seized the Chinese port of Qingdao and used it for a military base. The French leased Guangzhouwan from China. Also, in the First Sino-Japanese War, Japan defeated China. Xenophobia in China was widespread.

Beginning
The hoax began with four Denver newspaper reporters, Al Stevens, Jack Tournay, John Lewis, and Hal Wilshire, who represented the four Denver newspapers—the  Post, the Republican, the Times, and the Rocky Mountain News. The four met by chance at Denver Union Station where each were waiting in hopes of spotting someone of prominence who could become a subject for a news story. Seeing no celebrities and frustrated with no story in sight and deadlines due, Stevens remarked, "I don't know what you guys are going to do, but I'm going to fake it. It won't hurt anybody, so what the Devil." The other three men agreed to concoct a story and walked on 17th Street toward the Oxford Hotel to discuss possible ideas. 

Some stories, such as New York detectives tracking kidnappers of a rich heiress or the creation of a powerful company that would compete with the equally powerful Colorado Fuel and Iron Company were ruled out, as stories set in the United States were more likely to be checked and verified. The reporters then began running through countries such as Germany, Russia, and Japan until one of the reporters suggested China. John Lewis grew excited and exclaimed, "That's it, the Great Wall of China! Must be 50 years since that old pile's been in the news. Let's build our story around it. Let's do the Chinese a real favor. Let's tear the old pile down!"

The four reporters concocted a story in which the Chinese planned to demolish the Great Wall, constructing a road in its place, and were taking bids from American companies for the project. Chicago engineer Frank C. Lewis was bidding for the job. The story described a group of engineers in a Denver stopover on their way to China.

Although one of the reporters worried about the consequences of such an invented story, he was eventually overruled by the other reporters. Leaving the Oxford Bar, they went to the Windsor Hotel, signed four fictitious names to the register and told the desk clerk to say to anyone who asked that reporters had interviewed four men before they left for California.

The reporters swore they would stick to this story as fact as long as any of the others were still alive. The next day, all four major Denver newspapers, the Times, Post, Republican, and Rocky Mountain News featured the fabricated tale on their front pages. In the Times, as well as the other three papers, this was a typical headline:

Although the Denver papers dropped the story after a few days, the story did not die. Two weeks after the Denver headlines, John Lewis noticed that a large Eastern U.S. newspaper had picked up the story and included information not even in the original story. This newspaper included quotes from a Chinese mandarin confirming the story, with illustrations and comments about the tearing down of the wall. Eventually the story spread to newspapers all across the country and then into Europe. Although the story developed into different versions, the essence remained: Americans were going to China to tear down the Great Wall.

10 years later, the last surviving reporter of the hoax, Hal Wilshire, confessed the secret.

Harry Lee Wilber

The alleged Boxer Rebellion connection originated many years later with Denver songwriter Harry Lee Wilber (1875–1946). Wilber embellished the original tale when he wrote an article "A Fake That Rocked the World," for the North American Review in 1939. Wilber's article claimed that when the "pure canard" reached China, the newspapers there published it with "shouting headlines" and the Boxers, "already incensed, believed the yarn" and "all hell broke loose."

Wilber's article was reprinted 17 years later in Great Hoaxes of All Time (1956), edited by Robert Medill McBride and Neil Pritchie. Wilber, who composed the music for "Back to Dear Old Denver Town" (1912), was the first manager of the Fox Fullerton Theater (Fullerton, California) after it was constructed in 1924–25. The legend was also told in More of Paul Harvey's The Rest of the Story (1981).

Legacy
In 2012, the Denver Theater Center presented "The Great Wall Story," a play by Lloyd Suh, based on the incident.

Notes

References
Harvey, Jr., Paul. More of Paul Harvey's The Rest of the Story. Pages 136-138. New York: William Morrow & Co., 1980. 
Harvey, Jr., Paul. Good Housekeeping. Serialization of More of Paul Harvey's The Rest of the Story.
Klein, Alexander, editor. The Fabulous Rogues. New York: Ballantine, 1960.
 
 
 . Includes images of original articles.

External links
A typical Power of the Tongue sermon

19th-century hoaxes
Boxer Rebellion
Hoax
Hoaxes in the United States
Journalistic hoaxes
June 1899 events